Issers is a district in Boumerdès Province, Algeria. It was named after its capital, Isser.

Municipalities
The district is further divided into 4 municipalities:
Isser
Si Mustapha
Chabet El Ameur
Timezrit

History

French conquest

 First Battle of the Issers (1837)

Algerian Revolution

Salafist terrorism

 2008 Issers bombing (19 August 2008)

Zawiya

Zawiya Thaalibia

Notable people

 Sidi Abder Rahman El Thaelebi, Algerian Islamic scholar
 Mohamed Aïchaoui, Algerian journalist and resistant against French colonization.
 Raïs Hamidou, Algerian privateer.
 Ali Laskri, Algerian politician.

References

Districts of Boumerdès Province